The CF-18 Demonstration Team is a flight demonstration team of Royal Canadian Air Force's 1 Canadian Air Division. The team flies McDonnell Douglas CF-18 Hornet fighter aircraft at airshows in Canada and the United States to showcase air combat manoeuvring. The livery design of the team changes every year to highlight new military milestones or ideas. The team's members are selected from all divisions of the RCAF. The team's 2022 pilot is Captain Jesse "Modem" Haggart-Smith.

References

External links 
 

Royal Canadian Air Force